Augustus Frederick Adolphus Greeves (7 September 1806 – 23 May 1874) was a Mayor of Melbourne and Member of Parliament in Melbourne,  Australia.

Greeves was born in Knaresborough, Yorkshire, England. In 1840, he emigrated to Port Phillip District, the part of the Colony of New South Wales that became the Colony of Victoria in 1851. He was one of the first medical men to arrive in Melbourne. He was a surgeon, publican and local councillor and was the Mayor of the City of Melbourne between 1849 and 1850. He was also, for a short time, the editor of the Port Phillip Gazette and the Melbourne Morning Herald. He was a founding member of Manchester Unity I.O.O.F. in Victoria.

Greeves was a member of the Victorian Legislative Council from 1853 to 1856 for the City of Melbourne. Then he was a member of the inaugural Victorian Legislative Assembly for East Bourke 1856 to 1859, then Geelong East 1860 to 1861 and Belfast from 1864 to 1865. He died in Melbourne on 23 May 1874, at the age of 67 and is buried in Melbourne General Cemetery.

References
Notes

Bibliography
Australian Biography Online: Augustus Frederick Adolphus Greeves
FamilySearch International Genealogical Index v5.0

 

 

1806 births
1874 deaths
Mayors and Lord Mayors of Melbourne
People from Knaresborough
English emigrants to colonial Australia
Members of the Victorian Legislative Assembly
Members of the Victorian Legislative Council
19th-century Australian politicians
Burials at Melbourne General Cemetery